There are two types of hyperelliptic curves, a class of algebraic curves: real hyperelliptic curves and imaginary hyperelliptic curves which differ by the number of points at infinity. 
Hyperelliptic curves exist for every genus . The general formula of Hyperelliptic curve over a finite field  is given by 

where  satisfy certain conditions. In this page, we describe more about real hyperelliptic curves, these are curves having two points at infinity while imaginary hyperelliptic curves have one point at infinity.

Definition
A real hyperelliptic curve of genus g over K is defined by an equation of the form  where  has degree not larger than g+1 while  must have degree 2g+1 or 2g+2. The set of (finite) –rational points on C is given by

where  is the set of points at infinity.

Example
Let  where

Since  and  has degree 6, thus  is a curve of genus g = 2.

The homogeneous version of the curve equation is given by

It has a single point at infinity given by (0:1:0) but this point is singular. Hence this curve is an example of a real hyperelliptic curve.

In general, every curve given by an equation where f has even degree has two points at infinity and is a real hyperelliptic curve while those where f has odd degree have only a single point in the blowup over (0:1:0) and are thus imaginary hyperelliptic curves. In both cases this assumes that the affine part of the curve is non-singular (see the conditions on the derivatives above)

Arithmetic in a real hyperelliptic curve

In real hyperelliptic curve, addition is no longer defined on points as in elliptic curves but on divisors and the Jacobian. We write

The set  of divisors of  defined over  forms an additive abelian group under the addition rule 

We take an example:

If we add them then . Then, 

The elements which are defined over  form the group .

There are two canonical ways of representing divisor classes for real hyperelliptic curves  which have two points infinity . If  satisfies the additional condition  then the representative  is called reduced. Notice that  is allowed for some i. It follows that every degree 0 divisor class contain a unique representative  with 

The other representation is balanced at infinity.
If  is even then

If  is odd then 

For example, let the affine parts of two divisors be given by
 and 
then the balanced divisors are
 and

Transformation from real hyperelliptic curve to imaginary hyperelliptic curve

Let  be a real quadratic curve over a field . If there exists a ramified prime divisor of degree 1 in  then we are able to perform a birational transformation to an imaginary quadratic curve.
A (finite or infinite) point is said to be ramified if it is equal to its own opposite. It means that , i.e. that . If  is ramified then  is a ramified prime divisor.

The real hyperelliptic curve  of genus  with a ramified -rational finite point  is birationally equivalent to an imaginary model  of genus , i.e.  and the function fields are equal . Here:

In our example  where , h(x) is equal to 0. For any point ,  is equal to 0 and so the requirement for P to be ramified becomes .

For g = 2, we have .

giving the curve 
 where 

 is an imaginary quadratic curve since  has degree .

References

Algebraic curves